Andrzej Stękała (born 30 June 1995) is a Polish ski jumper, a member of the Polish national team and bronze medalist of the Ski Flying World Championships (2020) in team.

Career
Stękała's World Cup debut took place in Engelberg in 2015. His best result so far is third place with the Polish team at a team event in Zakopane in 2016. On 12 February 2016, on Vikersundbakken, he improved his personal best to 168 m. The next day he made a new personal best – 198 m. On 14 February 2015 he improved his personal best in the qualification during the same weekend in Vikersund to 235 m, which is 16.5 m less than the Polish national record (the record 251.5 m belongs to Kamil Stoch).

On 29 January 2021 he won the first qualifications in his career after a 152-meter jump (one meter shorter than the then hill record) in Willingen.

World Championships

Ski Flying World Championships

World Cup

Season standings

Individual starts

References

External links

1995 births
Living people
Sportspeople from Zakopane
Polish male ski jumpers
FIS Nordic World Ski Championships medalists in ski jumping